Galium collomiae, the Gila bedstraw. is a plant species in the family Rubiaceae. It is native to Arizona and New Mexico. This species was named for Rose E. Collom

References

External links
Gardening Europe

collomiae
Flora of Arizona
Flora of New Mexico
Plants described in 1949